The Guangtong–Dali or Guangda railway, is a single-track electrified railroad in Yunnan Province of Southwest China. The line branches off from the Guangtong station, near Kunming on the Chengdu–Kunming railway and runs west to Dali City. Major cities and towns along the route include Chuxiong City, Nanhua, Xiangyun County, Midu County and Dali. 

Construction on a new, 175-km dual-track electrified section of the line began in September 2010.  Difficulties in construction included 110,000 cubic meters of water inundation of the tunnels.  The new electrified line is scheduled to open for traffic in July 2018, upping speeds from 60 to 200 km/h and doubling the track.

Rail connections
 Guangtong: Chengdu–Kunming railway to Kunming
 Dali: Dali–Lijiang railway, Dali–Ruili railway

See also

 List of railways in China

References

Railway lines in China
Rail transport in Yunnan